Brahan may refer to:

Brahan Castle near Dingwall, Scotland
Siege of Brahan, November 1715
Brahan Seer, 17th-century predictor of the future